The 3 '''arrondissements of the Savoie department are:
 Arrondissement of Albertville, (subprefecture: Albertville) with 69 communes. The population of the arrondissement was 111,751 in 2016.
 Arrondissement of Chambéry, (prefecture of the Savoie department: Chambéry) with 151 communes. The population of the arrondissement was 274,839 in 2016.
 Arrondissement of Saint-Jean-de-Maurienne, (subprefecture: Saint-Jean-de-Maurienne) with 53 communes. The population of the arrondissement was 43,091 in 2016.

History

In 1860 the arrondissements of Chambéry, Albertville, Moûtiers and Saint-Jean-de-Maurienne were established. The arrondissement of Moûtiers was disbanded in 1926.

References

Savoie